Dolichocephala irrorata is a species of fly in the family Empididae. It is found in the  Palearctic.

References

External links
 Images representing Dolichocephala at BOLD

Empididae
Insects described in 1816
Asilomorph flies of Europe